Cuiu cuiu could be:

 the catfish Oxydoras niger
 the pileated parrot Pionopsitta pileata

Animal common name disambiguation pages